John Chester (born 25 October 1935) is a British rower. He competed in the men's eight event at the 1960 Summer Olympics.

References

1935 births
Living people
British male rowers
Olympic rowers of Great Britain
Rowers at the 1960 Summer Olympics